Pashtunization, also called Pathanization, is a process of cultural or linguistic change in which someone or something non-Pashtun becomes acculturated to Pashtun influence. Pashtuns are the largest ethnic group in Afghanistan and second-largest in Pakistan.

Dynasties and settlements

People become Pashtunized when they settle in Pashtun-dominated areas and adopt Pashtun culture and language. Pashtunization is a specific form of cultural assimilation and has been taking place in Pashtun-populated regions of Afghanistan and Pakistan for several centuries.

The Khalaj were originally a Turkic tribe which had long domiciled in the Ghazni, Qalati Ghilji (also known as Qalati Khalji), and Zabulistan regions of present-day Afghanistan. They intermarried with the local Pashtuns and gradually adopted the Pashtun culture. Najib Bakran's geography, Jahān Nāma (c. 12001220), described the Khalaj as a "tribe of Turks" that had been going through a language shift. Some of them left the area during the Mongol invasion of Central Asia towards the Indian subcontinent, where they built empires such as the Khalji dynasty of Delhi. Because of their language shift and Pashtunization, the Khalji were looked upon as Pashtuns (Afghans) by the Turkic nobles of the Delhi Sultanate.

The Safi are also stated to be orginally Dardic and spoke Pashayi language, who gradually Pashtunized after conversion to Islam.

Pashtunization may also refer to the settling of Pashtun tribes onto lands where non-Pashtun tribes live or more broadly the erosion of the customs, traditions and language of non-Pashtun peoples due to the political power and regional influence of the Pashtuns. This occurred in the Peshawar sub-region in the early 16th century, during the period of the Suri dynasty of Delhi. It intensified in the mid-18th century under Pashtun emperor Ahmad Shah Durrani, when he conquered non-Pashtun territories and established the Durrani Empire. During the reign of Abdur Rahman Khan in the late 19th century, some Pashtuns settled in the north of the country, while Tajiks from the north were brought to the south. This was done for political reason, mainly to prevent  Russian invasion. In the meantime, thousands of Hazaras left Hazarajat to settle in Quetta (now in Pakistan) and Mashad in what is now Iran, after Abdur Rahman Khan's depredations in the aftermath of 1888–1893 Uprisings of Hazaras.

Modern influences
Some Pashtunization attempts were later made in the early part of the 20th century by the Musahiban. Many non-Pashtuns living in close proximity with Pashtuns have been Pashtunized. For example, in the central Ghor Province, some southern groups of Aimaqs have adopted Pashto language. In the eastern Laghman Province and Nangarhar Province, many Pashayi are bilingual in Pashto.

See also 

Afghan (ethnonym)
Name of Afghanistan
Names of Khyber Pakhtunkhwa
Afghan Arabs
Afghanistanism
Pashtun colonization of northern Afghanistan
Hindu Pathans in India

Notes

External links 

Ethnicity and Tribe
Language and Literacy

Pashtun culture
Social history of Pakistan
Social history of Afghanistan
Cultural assimilation
Pakistani culture
Balochistan
Pashtun society